Koninklijke Sportkring Tongeren is a Belgian association football club based in Tongeren, currently playing in the fourth division. It was founded in 1908 as Cercle Sportif Tongrois. It received the matricule n°54. The club merged with K. Patria F.C. Tongeren to become K.S.K. Tongeren in 1969. In the 1970s it was a major club in the second division. Tongeren even managed to play two consecutive seasons in the first division (1981 to 1983). In 1996 the club were relegated to the third division.

External links 
 
 Belgian football clubs history
 RSSSF Archive – 1st and 2nd division final tables

Association football clubs established in 1908
Football clubs in Belgium
1908 establishments in Belgium
K.S.K. Tongeren
Organisations based in Belgium with royal patronage
Belgian Pro League clubs